Nagual Site is the third album by American composer Bill Laswell issued under the moniker Sacred System. It was released on August 25, 1998 by Wicklow.

Track listing

Personnel 
Adapted from the Nagual Site liner notes.
Musicians
Clive Bell – khene, shakuhachi
Bill Buchen – slit drum, tablas, ektārā, musical arrangements (1, 5, 8)
Sussan Deyhim – voice
Aïyb Dieng – bells, chatan pot drums
Hamid Drake – drums, frame drum
Craig Harris – trombone
Graham Haynes – cornet
Zakir Hussain – tabla
Gulam Mohamed Khan – harmonium, voice, musical arrangements (1, 5, 8)
Bill Laswell – bass guitar, keyboards, percussion, musical arrangements, producer
Byard Lancaster – soprano saxophone
David Liebman – soprano saxophone
Badal Roy – tabla, voice
Nicky Skopelitis – six-string guitar, twelve-string guitar
Jah Wobble – bass guitar
Bernie Worrell – electric piano, organ

Technical
Michael Fossenkemper – mastering
James Koehnline – illustrations
Robert Musso – engineering

Release history

References

External links 
 
 Nagual Site at Bandcamp

1998 albums
Bill Laswell albums
Albums produced by Bill Laswell